HANWA Hindu Temple also known as Hindu Temple of Northwest Arkansas is located in Bentonville, Arkansas and serves over 2500 Hindus residing in the Northwest Arkansas. The temple is located at 2502 SW Regional Airport Blvd, Bentonville, AR 72713

History
The land for Hindu Association of Northwest Arkansas (HANWA) was bought in 2009 and the groundbreaking began in 2011. The 4,000 Square Foot Hindu Temple opened on 29 July 2012, serving 2500 Hindus in the area.

References

Buildings and structures in Benton County, Arkansas
Hinduism in the United States
Religious buildings and structures completed in 2012
Religious organizations established in 2012
Asian-American culture in Arkansas
Indian-American culture in Arkansas